The Meeting of A Thousand Suns (also known as The Making of A Thousand Suns) is the eighth DVD by Linkin Park, released on September 08, 2010 through Warner Bros. Records and Machine Shop Records.

The release documented the band while recording their fourth studio album, A Thousand Suns. It was included in the limited edition of the album. It also features the band recording some demos like "Dingleberry", "Meadowlands", "Pac-Manny" and "Violent Lullaby". All of these demos are still left unreleased. But all the demos are modified and released as singles and tracks "When They Come for Me", "Waiting for the End", "Blackout" and "The Catalyst" respectively for the album.

Chapter listing

Personnel

Linkin Park 
 Chester Bennington – lead vocals
 Rob Bourdon – drums, backing vocals
 Brad Delson – guitars, backing vocals
 Joe Hahn – DJ, sampling, backing vocals
 Dave "Phoenix" Farrell – bass, backing vocals
 Mike Shinoda – MC, vocals, beats, sampling, guitar

Production 
 Produced by: Bill Boyd, Matthew Primm
 Executive Producers: Mike Shinoda, Joe Hahn, The Collective
 Director: Ryan Bartley
 Associate Producer and Cinematography: Mark Fiore
 Additional Footage: Mike Shinoda
 Edited by: Mandy Brown, Mariana Blanco, Ryan Bartley
 DVD-video producers: David May, Ghost Town Media
 Technical director: Linkin Park
 Sound Design: TK Broderick
 Art direction and design: Mike Shinoda
 Production Services: Films Dibovino
 Analog Effects: Ryan Bartley, TK Broderick
 Digital Effects: Brandon Parvini
 Effects Editing: Ryan Bartley, Brandon Parvini
 Color: Brandon Parvini
 Title Design: Josh Vanover
 Special Thanks: Rick Rubin, Warner Bros., NRG Recording Studios

References 

American documentary films
Linkin Park video albums
2010 video albums
Documentary films about heavy metal music and musicians
Warner Records video albums